Mathew Bose (born 3 July 1973) is a British actor. He is best known for his role as Paul Lambert in the soap opera Emmerdale from 2004 to 2010 and again in 2015.

Life and career

Bose was born 3 July 1973 in South East London. He has an older brother, Shuvro, who lives in London, and a sister, Shuva, who lives in India. When he was young, Bose's family moved to India. Most people don't realise I'm half Indian he reveals to Inside Soap. At the age of six, he returned to England to stay with his aunt. He has also lived in Milan, Paris, New York City, and  Los Angeles. He now lives in London. For a number of years he ran the Queens Head pub in Burley, Wharfedale. Bose is a qualified life coach and nutritionist. He is also related to the journalist Mihir Bose

In the early days of his career, Bose was a model. He worked all around Europe and in Tokyo and New York City. When he was working in Los Angeles he began to study psychology but it was when his lecturer suggested he join performance classes to bolster his confidence his interest in acting began. He showed great talent in Los Angeles and began to work there. Private circumstances brought him back to England.

Bose won his first role at 23, and has since appeared in many shows including the TV sitcom, My Family, Cutting It, Silent Witness, D-Day and Coupling. Bose also conducted interviews for, hosted and narrated the 2001 documentary, American Mullet (and the internet shorts The Mullet Chronicles). He has also worked in Italy, most prominently playing Enzo Ferrari's son Alfredo (Dino) Ferrari in the bio-pic of the Ferrari family.

He won the role of Paul Lambert in early 2004 and his first Emmerdale debut was in September 2004. In mid 2007, Bose and former castmate Hayley Tamaddon aka Del Dingle were crowned winners of the ITV show, Soapstar Superchef. Co-star Matthew Wolfenden stated in an interview that Bose is the highest scorer on the Wii that is in the games room on the set of Emmerdale.

In Emmerdale, his storylines focused on Paul's love life as well as his complicated relationship with his parents. Bose told producers of his intense dislike of Paul's one-night stand with Grayson Sinclair, as he felt this was out of character and made gay men look promiscuous. Bose left Emmerdale in 2008 but has since returned for brief stints: first in 2010 (for the wedding of Paul's sister, Nicola King), then again in March and September 2015.

Bose is Celebrity Ambassador for the UK and Ireland charity The Encephalitis Society; and is a patron of The Scratching Post, a cat rescue charity based in Hertfordshire.

In 2011 Bose toured with the Alan Ayckbourn show Season's Greetings.

References

External links

Emmerdale at itv.com
 The Encephalitis Society
 Mathew Bose official website 
 The Queens Head pub website

1973 births
Living people
English people of Indian descent
English male soap opera actors
English male actors of South Asian descent
British male actors of Indian descent
Male actors from London
Alumni of the Academy Drama School